Geoffrey FitzClarence may refer to:
 Geoffrey FitzClarence, 3rd Earl of Munster, British peer
 Geoffrey FitzClarence, 5th Earl of Munster, British peer and politician